Évora (São Mamede, Sé, São Pedro e Santo Antão) is a civil parish in the municipality of Évora, Portugal. It was formed in 2013 by the merger of the former parishes São Mamede, Sé e São Pedro and Santo Antão. The population in 2011 was 4,738, in an area of 1.13 km2.

Main sites
Santo Antão Church
Giraldo Square
Garcia de Resende Theatre

References

Freguesias of Évora